Chrysaspis may refer to:
 Chrysaspis (beetle) Saunders, 1869, a genus of beetles in the family Buprestidae
 Chrysaspis (wasp) Saussure 1887, a genus of wasps, synonym of Chrysis Linnaeus, 1761 
 Clover (Trifolium syn. Chrysaspis), a genus of plant in the family Fabaceae